Jan Cox may refer to:
 Jan Cox (painter), Dutch painter
 Jan Cox Speas (1925–1971), American short story writer and novelist

See also
Jan Cockx, Belgian painter
Jan Cock Blomhoff, Dutch director of a trading company